III EP is the fourth EP by recording artist Tinchy Stryder. It was released on 27 September 2010 by Takeover Entertainment as a free downloadable EP prior to the release of Stryder's third solo studio album, Third Strike, which was released on 15 November 2010.

The EP's cover art is a graphic image of Stryder with the, Third Strike logo, as a background in different shades of the colour green. The image was made during the Third Strike promo shoot.

The only singles released from the EP were track 1 "Champions" featuring Ruff Sqwad and track 2 "Famous".

Track listing

References

External links
 AUDIO : Tinchy Stryder – III EP (FREE DOWNLOAD). Rewind Magazine. 

2010 EPs
Tinchy Stryder albums
Takeover Entertainment EPs